Elena Philipieva (also spelt Olena Filipieva) (born 23 May 1970) is a Ukrainian prima ballerina and ballet director of the National Opera of Ukraine.

Biography 
Philipieva was born in the city of Dniprorudne in Ukraine. Her parents were athletes. As a child, she trained in gymnastics and then folk dancing. In 1988 she graduated from the Kyiv State Choreographic School. While studying, she performed in Giselle at the National Opera of Ukraine.

In 1988 Philipieva was appointed a ballet soloist of the National Opera of Ukraine and later started tutoring younger dancers. In 2020 she was promoted to the position of ballet director of the National Opera of Ukraine.

Maya Plisetskaya claimed her to be the best dancer she had ever seen and presented her with a ring as a sign of her admiration. At the age of 23, Philipieva was awarded a People's Artist of Ukraine title.

Philipieva has performed in Japan, Canada, US, Mexico, Brazil, Germany, France, Italy, Spain, Switzerland, Norway and many other countries. Among her partners were Nikolai Tsiskaridze, Farukh Ruzimatov, Alexander Vetrov, Alexei Fadeyechev, Patrick Dupond, Denis Matvienko.

Repertoire 
 Juliet in Romeo and Juliet
 The Sylph in La Sylphide
 Giselle in Giselle
 Kitri in Don Quixote
 Odette, Odile in Swan Lake
 Clara in The Nutcracker
 Medora in Le Corsaire
 Aneli in Viennese Waltz
 Princess Aurora in The Sleeping Beauty 
 Cinderella in Cinderella 
 Zoreslava in The Lord of Borisfen
 Mavka, Kylyna in Forest Song
 Susanna in The Marriage of Figaro
 Zobeide in Scheherazade 
 Carmen in Carmen Suite 
 Oksana in The Night Before Christmas 
 Marina in Zorba the Greek

Awards 
 1989: 3rd prize at International Ballet Competitions in Moscow
 1994: Gold Medal at St. Petersburg Maya Competition
 1996, 1999: Silver Medal at International Ballet and Modern Dance Competition, Japan
 2019: Order of Princess Olga

References

External links 
 
 

Ukrainian ballerinas
1970 births
Living people
21st-century ballet dancers
Prima ballerinas